Merriam's small-eared shrew (Cryptotis merriami) is a species of mammal in the family Soricidae. It is found in Chiapas, Guatemala, El Salvador, Honduras, Nicaragua and Costa Rica.

References

Merriam's small-eared shrew
Fauna of Southern Mexico
Mammals of Central America
Merriam's small-eared shrew